Last days or end time is the time period described by the eschatology of various religions.

Last Day or Last Days may also refer to:

Books
The Last Days (Rosenberg novel), a 2003 novel by Joel C. Rosenberg
The Last Days (Westerfeld novel), a 2006 novel by Scott Westerfeld
The Last Days (Masterson novel), a 1998 novel by Andrew Masterson
Last Days (Evenson novel), a 2009 novel by Brian Evenson
Last Days (Nevill novel), a 2012 novel by Adam Nevill
Latter Days (comics), a graphic novel by Dave Sim, and the last in the Cerebus collection series, whose second half is called The Last Day
The Last Day, a 2008 novel by John Ramsay Miller
The Last Day, a 2020 novel by Andrew Hunter Murray

Film and television
Last Day (film), a 1952 Spanish crime film directed by Antonio Román
The Last Day (1972 film), a 1972 Soviet drama film
The Last Days, a 1998 documentary film directed by James Moll
The Last Day (2004 film), a French film directed by Rodolphe Marconi
Last Days (2005 film), a 2005 film directed by Gus Van Sant
The Last Days (2013 film), the English title of Los Últimos Días, a 2013 Spanish post-apocalyptic film
Last Days (2014 film), a 2014 short film directed by Kathryn Bigelow
"Last Days" (Sliders), a 1995 episode of the American television program Sliders
"Lastday", the last day of a person's life in the film Logan's Run
"The Last Day" (Red Dwarf), a 1989 episode of sci-fi sitcom Red Dwarf
"The Last Day" (Doctor Who), a 2013 mini-episode of sci-fi series Doctor Who
"The Last Day" (Arthur), a 2016 episode
"The Last Day" (The Vampire Diaries), an episode of television series The Vampire Diaries
"The Last Day" (Brooklyn Nine-Nine), the finale of the television series Brooklyn Nine-Nine

Music
 "Lastday", a song by Star One from Victims of the Modern Age
"Last Day" (song), a 2009 song by Editors
 "Last Day" (featuring The Lox), a song by The Notorious B.I.G. from Life After Death
 "Der letzte Tag" (Tokio Hotel song) (The Last Day), a 2006 song by Tokio Hotel

See also
End of the world (disambiguation)